Snorkel may refer to:

Mechanical arrangements for conveying gases or fluids
 Snorkel (swimming), a breathing tube for swimmers or divers and its use in the activity of snorkeling
 Submarine snorkel, for submersible ships/boats
 Vehicle snorkel, for insignificantly buoyant submersible vehicles
 An aerial platform for fire engines
 Sheaffer Snorkel fountain pen, a fountain pen piston filling scheme

Other
 Sergeant Snorkel, a character in Beetle Bailey comics
 The Snorkel, a 1958 British film
 Snorkel parka, a type of anorak

See also
 Snorkel diving
 Snorkeling
 Snowkel, rock band from Odaiba, Japan  
 Snorks, cartoon about snorkel-bearing creatures